Róbert Veselovský (born 2 September 1985 in Nitra) is a Slovak football goalkeeper, who plays for Nea Salamina in Cypriot First Division.

Career
Veselovský started playing football in his hometown, at Nitra. At the age of eighteen, he joined 1. FC Slovácko and one year later he was loaned to Slovan Bratislava. In 2006 Veselovský transferred to the Swedish team Östers IF. He played there until 2008, relegating from Allsvenskan to Swedish Football Division 1. In 2013 to 2015 he played for Universitatea Cluj.

On the first of February 2008 Veselovský was loaned by the Danish Viborg FF as a backup solution for John Alvbåge and Kristian Kirk. He played eight matches in the 2007–08 Danish Superliga before being loaned again to the Norvegian side, Haugesund. On 26 January 2009 Veselovský returned to the second division team, Viborg FF with whom he signed a three-year contract. He was named the team's player of the year in 2010 and 2011.

On 18 November 2011, Veselovský signed a two and a half year contract with the Danish first division side AC Horsens. He had not gotten real playing time because of Frederik Rønnow's breakthrough and left the club in June 2013.

In September 2013 Veselovský was transferred by the Romanian first league Universitatea Cluj after being tested in two friendly matches. He played 24 matches and helped his team to avoid the relegation. In 2014, he signed a new contract with Universitatea Cluj, despite Steaua București's interest on him.

After another year at FC Universitatea Cluj, where he played the first Cup Final for the club in 50 years, Veselovský signed for FK Mladá Boleslav as a free agent.

In 2016, he joined Cyprus first division side Nea Salamis Famagusta FC.

References

External links

 Profile on Universitatea Cluj official site
 

Living people
1985 births
Sportspeople from Nitra
Slovak footballers
Association football goalkeepers
ŠK Slovan Bratislava players
Viborg FF players
Östers IF players
FK Haugesund players
AC Horsens players
FC Universitatea Cluj players
FK Mladá Boleslav players
Nea Salamis Famagusta FC players
Danish Superliga players
Liga I players
Cypriot First Division players
Slovak expatriate footballers
Expatriate men's footballers in Denmark
Expatriate footballers in Sweden
Expatriate footballers in Norway
Expatriate footballers in Romania
Expatriate footballers in Cyprus
Slovak expatriate sportspeople in Romania
Slovak expatriate sportspeople in Cyprus